The Nyali Bridge was a floating pontoon bridge linking Mombasa Island to the Kenyan mainland.

The bridge linked the Mzizima district of Mombasa to Nyali, and was built in 1931.

The western (Mombasa) approach to the bridge is the only remaining part of the bridge but one of the pontoon mooring anchors is on nearby display at the Tamarind Restaurant.

References 

Bridges in Kenya
Roads in Kenya
Buildings and structures in Mombasa
Bridges completed in 1931